The British Overseas Territory of Bermuda has been affected by several tornadoes and waterspouts in its history.

December 1925 tornado 
In the early hours of December 12, 1925 a weak tornado affected Ireland Island.  Beginning as a waterspout, it moved into the Ireland Island
Dock Yard. The Ormonde, a ship docked there, was nearly capsized, and the ship's barometer recorded an instantaneous drop of 4 mb. Moving onto land as a tornado, the vortex damaged roofs, sheds, and fences as it tore across the island. An office in the ship yard which contained another weather station was also struck—the barometer there recorded a drop of 6 mb. The damage path was approximately 300 yards across.

Easter tornadoes of 1953 
Four waterspouts moved from south to north over Bermuda in short succession, causing severe damage. About 90 properties were damaged, a few of which were deemed uninhabitable. The third one, which was the most damaging, struck Hamilton and Harrington Sound, killing one person. Several injuries were also confirmed from these storms.

January 1986 tornadoes 
On January 12, 1986, two tornadoes struck the north and south shores of the Main Island.  The first one, which touched down near Devonshire, caused significant damage as it cut across the island.  The second tornado affected St. David's, on the north shore, less than two hours later.  Several boats were sunk by the two twisters as they moved over water.

Hurricane Emily September 1987 
On September 25, 1987 Hurricane Emily made landfall in Bermuda as a category one hurricane on the Saffir-Simpson Hurricane Wind Scale. The fast moving hurricane was associated with several damaging tornadoes.

March 1992 
On March 21, 1992 U.S. Naval Oceanography Command Facility later confirmed a tornado struck the east end of the island, damaging the Naval Air Station. Damaged houses in St. David's remained in need some time later and Government assistance was arranged.

February 1993 
Damaging winds, possibly related to tornadic activity impacted the island early in the morning on February 19, 1993. The storms effects were felt hardest in Sandy's Parish and along North Shore. One person was injured and 100 customers lost electricity in the storms.

April 1993 
On April 15, 1993 U.S. Naval Oceanography Command Facility confirmed a tornado struck the west end causing "major damage" before dissipating over the Great Sound. This tornado was followed by heavy rains. Damage was reportedly done to 25 homes in the Somerset area and Government prepared to offer assistance. The severe thunderstorm responsible for this tornado also produced at least "marble sized hail" that covered the ground in spots.

March 1999 
There were several reports of tornadoes on March 4, 1999. One tornado was spotted offshore and another was spotted later in the day coming ashore in Smith's parish damaging a construction site and two homes. Bermuda Weather Service did not make a conclusion on whether this was a tornado.

April 2000 
A reported tornado damaged Spice Valley high school as it struck in the evening on April 27, 2000. The Bermuda Weather Service meteorologists indicated active thunderstorms in the area possibly produced an isolated tornado.

December 2002 
December 14, 2002 saw nighttime tornadoes strike south shore, hitting hotels particularly hard in Southampton parish where $100,000 in property damage was done. The Bermuda Weather Service suggested this could have been a small tornado.

Hurricane Fabian September 2003 
Several unconfirmed reports of tornadoes spawned by Hurricane Fabian as it made a direct-hit on the island on September 5, 2003. One such possible tornado severely damaged St. George's Preparatory school. It was impossible to discern tornado damage from hurricane damage and so these reported tornadoes went unconfirmed.

January 2004 
Weekend severe weather on the morning of January 10, 2004 included reports of tornadoes striking parts of Pembroke, Hamilton, Southampton and Warwick parishes. Damage was reported at the local Saltus Grammar School and nearby neighborhoods in Pembroke where the Bermuda Weather Service confirmed a tornado struck.

July 2005 
A 'freak storm' struck parts of Smith's parish at around 6:30am  on July 16, 2005 causing some roof damage. While residents were convinced it was a tornado, and Bermuda Weather Service radar suggested severe weather in the area, they could not conclusively say whether this was tornado damage.

November 2005 
A reported tornado ripped the roofs off several homes in Sandy's parish on the afternoon of November 2, 2005. A later investigation by the Bermuda Weather Service suggested this was the work of a gustnado with gusts up to 80 kn.

Hurricane Florence September 2006
Unconfirmed reports of tornado damage well in advance of Hurricane Florence in Southampton as the outer bands of the hurricane spiraled across the island on the afternoon of September 10, 2006.

December 2009 
On December 19, 2009, a tornado touched down in downtown Hamilton, Pembroke parish. It created a swath of damage from Pitt's Bay road to First Avenue in the Cavendish Heights area of Pembroke. Hardest hit areas included the commercial areas of Reid Street from Queen Street to Court Street, and parts of Bermudiana Road. Although there were no reports of serious injuries, there was significant tree and roof damage, and the tornado was estimated to be an EF1 or EF2 on the Enhanced Fujita Scale. There were other reports of tornadoes that turned out to be straight line winds from severe thunderstorms at Devonshire Bay, where trees were snapped and  a fence was reported to have been knocked over.

Hurricane Sandy October 2012 
On October 28, 2012, showers associated with the outermost circulation of a distant Hurricane Sandy were affecting the island. One of these showers briefly produced a tornado that resulted in roof damage and boundary wall damage to structures in Somerset Village in Sandy's Parish. The Bermuda Weather Service rated the tornado F0 on the Fujita Scale.

References 

 
Bermuda